= La Nahuaterique =

La Nahuaterique is a village in Honduras. The village is situated near the border with El Salvador and has a population of approximately 6500 people. Until a decision of the International Court of Justice in 1992 placed it in Honduras based on Spanish colonial boundaries, the village was disputed between El Salvador and Honduras. Today, the population of the village is still mostly Salvadoran, although an agreement between the two governments in 1998 promised dual citizenship to its inhabitants, as well as to those of other border areas. Nahuaterique comes from Lenca-Potón word means: Horn Mountain.
